Debbie Massey (born November 5, 1950) is an American professional golfer.

Before joining the LPGA Tour, Massey worked as a skiing instructor. She was LPGA rookie of the year in 1977.

Massey won three events on the LPGA Tour, not including back-to-back victories in the Women's British Open, which is now one of the LPGA's major championships.

Amateur wins
1972 Women's Western Amateur
1974 Canadian Women's Amateur
1975 Canadian Women's Amateur, South Atlantic Amateur, Eastern Amateur, Women's Western Amateur
1976 Canadian Women's Amateur

Professional wins

LPGA Tour wins (3)

LPGA Tour playoff record (1–3)

Ladies European Tour wins (2)
1980 Women's British Open
1981 Women's British Open

U.S. national team appearances
Amateur
Curtis Cup: 1974 (winners), 1976 (winners)
Espirito Santo Trophy: 1974 (winners), 1976 (winners)

References

External links

American female golfers
LPGA Tour golfers
Golfers from Michigan
University of Denver alumni
People from Grosse Pointe, Michigan
People from Cheboygan, Michigan
1950 births
Living people
21st-century American women